XYZ may refer to:

Music
 XYZ (American band), hard rock band
 XYZ (XYZ album), 1989 debut album
 XYZ (Andy Summers album), a 1987 solo album by Andy Summers
 XYZ (Gloo album), the 2019 debut album by English group Gloo
 XYZ (English band), an aborted rock project featuring Jimmy Page, Chris Squire and Alan White
 The XYZ Affair, an American indie rock
 ...XYZ, a 1992 album by British indie band Moose
 XYZ (ExWhyZ album), 2022 debut album

Other uses
 Cartesian coordinate system (x,y,z)
 CIE 1931 color space, color coordinates called "XYZ"
Here XYZ, a mapping product from Here Technologies
 Pokémon the Series: XYZ, the 19th season of Pokémon and the 3rd and final season of Pokemon the Series: XY
 XYZ (game show), a British daytime TV quiz show
 XYZ Affair, American–French diplomatic incident
 XYZ convention, a bidding convention in contract bridge
 XYZ (computer), a Polish computer invention
 XYZ Entertainments, a Zambian music record label 
 XYZ file format, a chemical file format
 XYZ Films, an American film production and sales company
 XYZ Line or Matallana Line, a system of fortifications built during the Spanish Civil War
XYZ Records, a record label
 The XYZ Show, a Kenyan satirical puppet show
 .xyz, an Internet top-level domain released in 2014
 XYZnetworks, an Australian production company
 Xyz Monsters, in Yu-Gi-Oh! Zexal
 XYZ, a proposed, but not realized, re-branding of ABC Family (now Freeform)
 XYZ, a placeholder in conversation; eg, "Let's say I'm here to do XYZ on Tuesday"

See also
 WXYZ (disambiguation), several radio and television call signs